

From 2,000 to 2,999 

 2000 Herschel
 2001 Einstein
 2002 Euler
 2003 Harding
 2004 Lexell
 2005 Hencke
 2006 Polonskaya
 2007 McCuskey
 2008 Konstitutsiya
 2009 Voloshina
 2010 Chebyshev
 2011 Veteraniya
 2012 Guo Shou-Jing
 2013 Tucapel
 2014 Vasilevskis
 
 2016 Heinemann
 2017 Wesson
 
 2019 van Albada
 
 
 2022 West
 2023 Asaph
 2024 McLaughlin
 
 2026 Cottrell
 
 2028 Janequeo
 2029 Binomi
 
 2031 BAM
 2032 Ethel
 2033 Basilea
 2034 Bernoulli
 2035 Stearns
 2036 Sheragul
 2037 Tripaxeptalis
 2038 Bistro
 2039 Payne-Gaposchkin
 
 
 
 2043 Ortutay
 2044 Wirt
 
 2046 Leningrad
 2047 Smetana
 
 
 
 
 2052 Tamriko
 
 2054 Gawain
 2055 Dvořák
 2056 Nancy
 
 2058 Róka
 2059 Baboquivari
 2060 Chiron
 2061 Anza
 2062 Aten
 2063 Bacchus
 2064 Thomsen
 2065 Spicer
 
 2067 Aksnes
 
 2069 Hubble
 
 
 2072 Kosmodemyanskaya
 
 2074 Shoemaker
 
 
 
 
 
 2080 Jihlava
 
 
 
 
 2085 Henan
 
 
 
 
 2090 Mizuho
 2091 Sampo
 
 2093 Genichesk
 2094 Magnitka
 
 
 
 2098 Zyskin
 2099 Öpik
 2100 Ra-Shalom
 2101 Adonis
 2102 Tantalus
 
 2104 Toronto
 
 
 
 
 
 
 2111 Tselina
 
 
 2114 Wallenquist
 
 
 
 
 
 2120 Tyumenia
 2121 Sevastopol
 2122 Pyatiletka
 2123 Vltava
 
 
 2126 Gerasimovich
 2127 Tanya
 
 
 
 2131 Mayall
 
 
 2134 Dennispalm
 2135 Aristaeus
 
 
 
 2139 Makharadze
 2140 Kemerovo
 
 
 2143 Jimarnold
 
 2145 Blaauw
 2146 Stentor
 
 2148 Epeios
 
 
 2151 Hadwiger
 
 2153 Akiyama
 
 
 2156 Kate
 
 
 2159 Kukkamäki
 
 
 
 
 
 
 
 
 
 2169 Taiwan
 
 
 
 2173 Maresjev
 
 2175 Andrea Doria
 
 
 
 
 
 2181 Fogelin
 
 
 
 
 
 2187 La Silla
 
 
 
 
 
 
 
 2195 Tengström
 
 2197 Shanghai
 
 
 
 2201 Oljato
 2202 Pele
 
 2204 Lyyli
 
 
 2207 Antenor
 
 
 
 
 2212 Hephaistos
 2213 Meeus
 
 
 
 
 
 
 
 
 
 2223 Sarpedon
 
 
 
 2227 Otto Struve
 2228 Soyuz-Apollo
 
 
 
 
 
 
 
 
 
 
 
 
 2241 Alcathous
 
 
 2244 Tesla
 
 2246 Bowell
 
 
 
 
 
 
 2253 Espinette
 
 
 
 
 
 
 2260 Neoptolemus
 
 
 
 
 
 
 
 
 
 
 
 
 
 
 
 
 
 2278 Götz
 
 
 
 
 
 
 2285 Ron Helin
 
 
 
 
 
 
 
 
 
 
 2296 Kugultinov
 
 
 
 
 2301 Whitford
 
 
 
 
 
 
 2308 Schilt
 
 
 2311 El Leoncito
 2312 Duboshin
 
 
 
 
 
 
 
 
 
 
 
 2324 Janice
 2325 Chernykh
 
 
 2328 Robeson
 
 
 
 
 
 
 
 
 
 
 
 2340 Hathor
 
 
 
 
 
 
 
 2348 Michkovitch
 2349 Kurchenko
 
 
 
 
 
 
 
 2357 Phereclos
 
 
 
 
 
 2363 Cebriones
 
 
 
 
 2368 Beltrovata
 
 
 
 
 
 
 
 
 
 
 
 
 
 
 
 2384 Schulhof
 
 
 
 
 
 
 2391 Tomita
 
 
 
 
 
 
 
 
 
 
 
 
 
 
 
 
 
 
 
 
 
 
 
 
 
 
 
 
 2420 Čiurlionis
 
 
 2423 Ibarruri
 
 
 
 
 
 2429 Schürer
 2430 Bruce Helin
 
 
 2433 Sootiyo
 
 
 2436 Hatshepsut
 
 
 
 2440 Educatio
 
 2442 Corbett
 2443 Tomeileen
 
 
 
 
 
 2449 Kenos
 
 
 
 
 
 
 2456 Palamedes
 
 
 
 
 
 
 
 
 
 
 
 
 
 
 
 
 
 
 
 
 
 2478 Tokai
 
 
 
 
 2483 Guinevere
 
 
 2486 Metsähovi
 
 
 
 2490 Bussolini
 
 
 
 
 
 
 
 
 
 2500 Alascattalo
 
 
 
 
 
 
 
 
 
 
 
 
 2513 Baetslé
 
 
 
 
 2518 Rutllant
 
 
 
 
 
 
 
 
 
 
 
 
 2531 Cambridge
 
 
 
 
 
 2537 Gilmore
 
 
 
 
 2542 Calpurnia
 
 
 
 
 
 
 
 
 
 
 
 2554 Skiff
 
 
 
 
 
 
 
 
 
 
 
 
 
 
 
 
 2571 Geisei
 2572 Annschnell
 
 
 2575 Bulgaria
 
 2577 Litva
 2578 Saint-Exupéry
 
 
 
 
 
 
 
 
 
 
 
 2590 Mourão
 2591 Dworetsky
 
 
 2594 Acamas
 
 
 
 2598 Merlin
 
 
 
 
 
 
 
 2606 Odessa
 
 2608 Seneca
 
 
 
 
 2613 Plzeň
 
 
 
 
 
 
 
 
 
 2623 Zech
 
 
 
 
 
 2629 Rudra
 
 
 
 
 
 
 
 2637 Bobrovnikoff
 
 
 
 
 
 
 2644 Victor Jara
 
 
 
 2648 Owa
 
 
 
 
 
 
 
 
 
 2658 Gingerich
 
 
 2661 Bydžovský
 
 
 
 
 
 
 
 
 
 
 2672 Písek
 
 2674 Pandarus
 2675 Tolkien
 
 
 2678 Aavasaksa
 
 
 
 
 
 
 2685 Masursky
 
 
 
 
 
 2691 Sersic
 
 
 
 
 2696 Magion
 2697 Albina
 
 
 
 
 
 
 
 
 
 
 2708 Burns
 2709 Sagan
 
 
 
 
 
 
 
 
 
 
 
 
 
 
 
 
 2726 Kotelnikov
 
 
 
 2730 Barks
 
 2732 Witt
 
 
 
 
 
 
 
 
 2741 Valdivia
 
 
 2744 Birgitta
 
 
 2747 Český Krumlov
 
 
 
 2751 Campbell
 2752 Wu Chien-Shiung
 
 2754 Efimov
 
 
 
 
 2759 Idomeneus
 
 
 
 
 
 
 
 
 
 
 
 
 
 
 
 
 
 
 
 
 
 
 
 
 
 
 
 
 
 
 
 
 
 
 
 
 
 2797 Teucer
 
 
 
 
 
 
 
 
 
 2807 Karl Marx
 
 
 
 
 
 
 
 2815 Soma
 
 
 
 
 
 
 
 
 
 
 2826 Ahti
 
 
 2829 Bobhope
 2830 Greenwich
 
 
 
 
 
 
 
 
 2839 Annette
 
 
 
 
 
 
 
 
 
 
 
 
 
 
 
 
 
 
 
 
 
 
 2862 Vavilov
 
 
 2865 Laurel
 
 2867 Šteins
 
 
 
 
 
 2873 Binzel
 2874 Jim Young
 
 
 
 
 
 
 
 2882 Tedesco
 
 
 
 
 
 
 
 
 
 2892 Filipenko
 2893 Peiroos
 
 2895 Memnon
 
 
 
 
 
 
 
 2903 Zhuhai
 
 2905 Plaskett
 2906 Caltech
 
 
 
 
 
 
 
 
 
 
 
 
 
 2920 Automedon
 
 
 
 
 
 
 2927 Alamosa
 
 
 
 
 
 
 2934 Aristophanes
 
 
 2937 Gibbs
 
 2939 Coconino
 2940 Bacon
 
 2942 Cordie
 
 
 
 
 
 
 
 
 
 
 
 
 
 2956 Yeomans
 
 
 2959 Scholl
 
 
 
 
 
 
 
 
 
 
 
 
 
 
 
 2975 Spahr
 
 
 
 
 2980 Cameron
 2981 Chagall
 
 
 2984 Chaucer
 2985 Shakespeare
 
 
 
 
 
 
 
 
 
 2995 Taratuta
 
 2997 Cabrera

See also 
 List of minor planet discoverers
 List of observatory codes

References

External links 
 Discovery Circumstances: Numbered Minor Planets, Minor Planet Center

Lists of minor planets by name